Grass spider may refer to:

 genus Agelena, the Eurasian grass spiders
 genus Agelenopsis, the American grass spiders

See also
 genus Oxytate, the (green) grass crab spiders
 genus Runcinia, the (brown) grass crab spiders
 species Argiope catenulata, the grass cross spider
 species Florinda coccinea, the red grass spider

Set index articles on spiders